Adrian Philip Ramsay (born 1981) is a British politician and co-leader of the Green Party of England and Wales alongside Carla Denyer. He was previously the deputy leader of the Green Party of England and Wales from 2008 to 2012. He served as a Norwich City Councillor from 2003 to 2011.

He worked as chief executive of the Centre for Alternative Technology from 2014 to 2019 and from 2019 has been CEO of MCS Charitable Foundation.

Early life and education
Ramsay was born and brought up in Norwich. He studied as an undergraduate at the University of East Anglia (UEA), where he gained a first class honours degree in politics. He went on to study for a master's degree.

Early political career (2003–2012)

Norwich 
Ramsay was first elected to Norwich City Council representing Henderson Ward in May 2003, representing the Green Party. Aged 21, he was one of the youngest councillors in the UK. Later that year, he spoke at a demonstration against tuition fees in the United Kingdom. Ramsay was re-elected in June 2004 for Nelson Ward. Ramsay stood as parliamentary candidate in the Norwich South constituency in the 2005 general election. He came fourth, with 7.4% of the vote (3,101 votes).

In a BBC article from May 2006, Ramsay was described as "pursuing a full-time career through his council work on a £9,500 annual allowance". In 2007, he was elected for a third time. In 2010, he was serving as the leader of the opposition to the Labour council. At the 2011 local elections, he did not seek re-election to Norwich City Council.

Ramsay stood for Norwich South again in the 2010 general election. The party's leader Caroline Lucas cited him as one of the Green candidates with the greatest chance of winning. Ramsay came in fourth place with 14.9% of the vote (7,095 votes). He co-organised Lucas's campaign in Brighton Pavilion which saw her elected as the UK's first Green Member of Parliament (MP).

Green Party deputy leader 
Ramsay was elected unopposed as the first deputy leader of the Green Party of England and Wales on 5 September 2008. In 2009 he made a speech at the party's conference calling for the end private finance initiative agreements in the NHS. He was re-elected as Deputy Leader in the 2010 leadership election with 73.4% of the vote. He was speculated as a possible successor to the party's first leader, Caroline Lucas, but did not stand in the 2012 leadership election nor seek re-election as deputy leader.

Leader of the Green Party (2021–present) 
On 16 August 2021 Ramsay announced his candidacy for co-leader of the Green Party alongside the Bristol councillor Carla Denyer. He said that the IPCC Sixth Assessment Report had motivated him to return to politics. The pair's joint candidacy emphasised professionalising the party and winning a second Green MP and a first Green Member of the Senedd (MS).

The announcement that the pair had been elected was made on 1 October 2021.

Career 
Ramsay served as chief executive of the Centre for Alternative Technology from 2014 to 2019, working in Wales. He returned to Norfolk in 2019 and took up the post of chief executive of the MCS Charitable Foundation, in which position he remained as of 2021.

Elections contested

European Parliament

House of Commons

Council

Leader of the Green Party

Deputy leader of the Green Party

References

External links
Cllr. Adrian Ramsay's Green Party Website Biography
Adrian Ramsay's Norwich Green Party Website Biography

1981 births
Living people
Alumni of the University of East Anglia
Green Party of England and Wales parliamentary candidates
Politicians from Norwich
Leaders of political parties in the United Kingdom
Green Party of England and Wales councillors